

Table

Matches

South Korea vs Soviet Union

United States vs Argentina

South Korea vs United States

Soviet Union vs Argentina

South Korea vs Argentina

Soviet Union vs United States

External links
 sports-reference

Group
1988–89 in Argentine football
1988 in Soviet football
Group
1988 in South Korean football